Johnson County is a county located in the U.S. state of Arkansas. As of the 2020 census, the population was 25,749. The county seat is Clarksville. Johnson County is Arkansas's 30th county, formed on November 16, 1833, from a portion of Pope County and named for Benjamin Johnson, a Territorial Judge. It is an alcohol prohibition or dry county.

Geography

Major highways
 Interstate 40
 U.S. Route 64
 Arkansas Highway 21
 Arkansas Highway 103
 Arkansas Highway 109
 Arkansas Highway 123

Adjacent counties
Newton County (north)
Pope County (east)
Logan County (south)
Franklin County (west)
Madison County (northwest)

National protected area
 Ozark National Forest (part)

Demographics

2000 census
As of the 2000 census, there were 22,781 people, 8,738 households, and 6,238 families residing in the county. The population density was 34 people per square mile (13/km2). There were 9,926 housing units at an average density of 15 per square mile (6/km2). The racial makeup of the county was 93.69% White, 1.37% Black or African American, 0.62% Native American, 0.25% Asian, 0.01% Pacific Islander, 2.62% from other races, and 1.43% from two or more races. 6.70% of the population were Hispanic or Latino of any race.

There were 8,738 households, out of which 32.40% had children under the age of 18 living with them, 58.10% were married couples living together, 9.50% had a female householder with no husband present, and 28.60% were non-families. 24.60% of all households were made up of individuals, and 11.60% had someone living alone who was 65 years of age or older. The average household size was 2.54 and the average family size was 3.01.

In the county, the population was spread out, with 25.20% under the age of 18, 9.70% from 18 to 24, 27.60% from 25 to 44, 22.70% from 45 to 64, and 14.80% who were 65 years of age or older. The median age was 36 years. For every 100 females there were 99.00 males. For every 100 females age 18 and over, there were 95.40 males.

The median income for a household in the county was $27,910, and the median income for a family was $33,630. Males had a median income of $25,779 versus $19,924 for females. The per capita income for the county was $15,097. About 12.90% of families and 16.40% of the population were below the poverty line, including 19.60% of those under age 18 and 15.30% of those age 65 or over.

2020 census
As of the 2020 United States census, there were 25,749 people and 9,792 households in the county.

Racial composition

Government

Politics
Over the past few election cycles, Johnson County has trended heavily toward the GOP. The last Democratic presidential candidate to carry this county was Arkansas native Bill Clinton in 1992 and 1996.

Cities
Clarksville (county seat)
Coal Hill
Hartman
Knoxville
Lamar

Census-designated places
 Hagarville
Oark
Ozone

Other unincorporated communities
Gillian Settlement
Harmony
Hickeytown
Pittsburg

Townships

 Batson
 Dickerson-Hill
 Grant (Coal Hill)
 Hickey
 Horsehead
 Howell (most of Knoxville)
 Lee
 Low Gap
 McKennon
 Mulberry
 Perry (CDP Hagarville)
 Pittsburg (most of Lamar, small part of Knoxville)
 Prairie (small part of Clarksville)
 Red Lick
 Sherman
 Spadra (most of Clarksville, small part of Lamar)
 Stonewall
 Ward (Hartman)

See also
 List of lakes in Johnson County, Arkansas
 National Register of Historic Places listings in Johnson County, Arkansas

References

 
1833 establishments in Arkansas Territory
Populated places established in 1833